The Irish League in season 1996–97 comprised 8 teams, and Crusaders won the championship.

Premier Division

League standings

Results

Matches 1–14

Matches 15–28

First Division

League standings

References
Northern Ireland - List of final tables (RSSSF)

NIFL Premiership seasons
1
Northern